about is an internal URI scheme (also known as a "URL scheme" or, erroneously, "protocol") implemented in various Web browsers to reveal internal state and built-in functions. It is an IANA officially registered scheme, and is standardized.

In early versions of Netscape, any URI beginning with about: that wasn't recognized as a built-in command would simply result in the text after the colon being displayed. Still other versions of Netscape would return various phrases in response to an unknown about URI, including "Whatchew talkin' 'bout, Willis?" (a catch phrase from the TV show Diff'rent Strokes) or "Homey don't play dat!" (from a recurring skit on the TV show In Living Color).

The most commonly implemented about URIs are about:blank, which displays a blank HTML document, and simply about:, which may display information about the browser. Some browsers use URIs beginning with the name of the browser for similar purposes, and many about URIs will be translated into the appropriate URI if entered. Examples are opera (Opera) or chrome (Google Chrome). An exception is about:blank, which is not translated.

Standardization
In 2010, and onwards, there are efforts to standardize the about URI scheme, and define the processing requirements for some specific URIs, in the IETF Applications Area Working Group (APPSAWG). The about URIs that have since been defined and assigned by IANA are listed below.

Common

Chrome and Chromium derivatives
The following applies to all web browsers that derive from the Chromium project, including Google Chrome, Microsoft Edge, Opera, and Vivaldi.

The above list is not exhaustive; for a full list, see about:about URI.

Firefox
Many of these can also be used in Thunderbird, by setting them as the "Mail Start Page". Also, some extensions define additional about: URIs not listed here.

Opera (v1–15)
In Opera, about: is an alias for the opera: scheme; therefore all these URIs also work with about prefixed. User JavaScript is enabled for all URIs in the about: or opera: schemes as a security feature. These pages can, however, be styled using local stylesheets.

None of these functions, except the opera:about combination, work in the Nintendo DS Browser, which is an Opera derivative.

Internet Explorer (6–11)
Internet Explorer about URIs are configurable in Windows. It is therefore possible that some of the listed URIs will not work on a particular computer. For example, "about:mozilla" was removed in SP2 (although the page can still be found at "res://mshtml.dll/about.moz").  These about URIs are sometimes used for spyware and adware, most notably in CoolWebSearch, which made about:blank display advertisements.

Any about URI that is not recognized by Internet Explorer redirects to a page saying "Navigation to the webpage was canceled."

Microsoft Edge (v20–44)
The following applies to Microsoft Edge version 20 through 44, which Microsoft dubs "the legacy Edge." For newer versions, see the Chromium section.

GNOME Web
When GNOME Web (formerly Epiphany) used Gecko as its layout engine, all Firefox-specific about: URIs worked in it. After the adoption of WebKit as its layout engine, only the following URIs are supported.

Netscape
The about: URL originated in and has existed in all versions of Netscape browsers.  It was originally added as an Easter egg to display information about the development team.

Older versions of the Netscape browser have an about:people URI that was similar to about:credits above, but it would redirect to Netscape's active employee listing. In addition, about:username, where username is the username of a Netscape employee, would redirect to the Netscape homepage of the employee specified. For example, about:jwz would redirect to http://people.netscape.com/jwz/ (not an active link). Not all employee pages were accessible through this scheme. Only developers who knew which file in the source tree and the encoding scheme used to obfuscate the directory of employee about entries could add their names.

Many other about: easter eggs existed, including the famous about:mozilla, and other less known ones that showed pictures of the Netscape mascot Mozilla in various foreign garb, such as about:deutsch showing Mozilla in Lederhosen.

Some versions of Netscape would display the browser history for the about:global URI.

Others

 In Konqueror, any about URI except about:blank and about:plugins redirects to about:konqueror, which shows a friendly ‘start’ and navigation page.
 In Internet Explorer for Mac 5 was an offline Easter egg, accessible by typing ‘about:tasman’, showing the Acid1 test with the text replaced by the names of the developers.
 Safari only recognizes about:blank.
 Microsoft Outlook supports an additional outlook:today URI, which shows the Outlook Today Screen. This screen shows messages, tasks and appointments; it is also accessible from Internet Explorer. Outlook recognizes about:blank too, but no other "about:" URIs.

Notes

References

External links
 - The "about" URI Scheme
About protocol links in Mozilla and Mozilla Firefox.
about redirectors' source code in Firefox

Web browsers
Mozilla
URI schemes